Jessica Green may refer to:
 Jessica Green (academic), American engineer, ecologist, and entrepreneur
 Jessica Green (actress), Australian actress